"My Sister and I" is a 1941 song written by Hy Zaret, Joan Whitney and Alex Kramer, recorded by Jimmy Dorsey, with vocals by Bob Eberly.

Background
The Jimmy Dorsey release on Decca Records hit number one on the Billboard charts on June 7, 1941.

Sheet music of the time shows a boy and girl in Dutch clothing, with windmills in the background.  Under the title appears the description "As inspired by the Current Best Seller 'My Sister and I' by Dirk van der Heide."  The lyric is in the voice of a child who has—with a sister—left a war zone by boat and begun a new life abroad. The line "the fear/That came from a troubled sky" along with the song's release date implies the evacuation of children from the countries ravaged by World War II, such as the London Blitz the previous winter.

Other recordings
Other chart hits in 1941 were by Bea Wain, Bob Chester (vocal by Bill Darnell) and by Benny Goodman (vocal by Helen Forrest).

References

Sources
Stockdale, Robert L. Jimmy Dorsey: A Study in Contrasts. (Studies in Jazz Series). Lanham, MD: The Scarecrow Press, Inc., 1999.

1941 songs
1941 singles
Jimmy Dorsey songs
Songs of World War II
Songs written by Alex Kramer
Songs written by Hy Zaret
Songs written by Joan Whitney (songwriter)